is a former Japanese football player.

Playing career
Serada was born in Kitakyushu on October 20, 1973. After graduating from high school, he joined Kashima Antlers in 1992. However he could not play in the match. He moved to Cerezo Osaka in 1996. He played several matches as left side back. He retired end of 1997 season.

Club statistics

References

External links

awx.jp
cerezo-museum.com

1973 births
Living people
Association football people from Fukuoka Prefecture
Japanese footballers
J1 League players
Kashima Antlers players
Cerezo Osaka players
Association football defenders